Maciej Obara (born 18 December 1981) is a Polish jazz musician (alto and tenor saxophone), composer and bandleader.

Biography 
From the mid-2000s, Obara worked with Marek Kądziela's ensemble ADHD (mit Kasper Tom Christiansen, Piotr Damasiewicz, Rudi Mahal) and the band and Power of the Horns, and also recorded with several of his own projects, first with his own trio Message from Ohayo (2007, mit Krzysztof Gradziuk, and Maciej Garbowski). The music documented there won the jazz competition of Bielska Zadymka for young jazz bands in 2006, and led to his international breakthrough. In 2008 he toured in Poland with Antoine Roney. Manfred Eicher became aware of him and recommended him to Tomasz Stańko, to play for the Tomasz Stańko Special Project and in New Balladyna Quartet. In the following years he continued with his own projects, in addition to another trio with John Lindberg und Harvey Sorgen (Three, 2010), with his Quartet (Equlilibrium, 2011, including Dominik Wania, Krzysztof Gradziuk, Maciej Garbowski) as well as the Obara International (Quartet) (with Dominik Wania, Gard Nilssen, Ole Morten Vågan, Tom Arthurs), with whom he has appeared internationally at numerous festivals since 2013 and has produced several albums, including a production of compositions by Krzysztof Komeda. He was also involved in recordings by Michael Jefry Stevens/Joe Fonda.

Discography

Solo albums 
 Maciej Obara Trio
 2007: Message from Ohayo (Polskie Radio Katowice), with Maciej Garbowski og Krzysztof Gradziuk
 2009: I Can Do It (Jaz Records), with Maciej Garbowski og Krzysztof Gradziuk
 2010: Three (Ars Cameralis), with John Lindberg og Harvey Sorgen

 Obara Special Quartet
 2010: Four (Ars Cameralis Silesiae Superior), with Mark Helias, Nasheet Venter og Ralph Alessi

 Maciej Obara Quartet
 2011: Equilibrium (Ars Cameralis Silesiae Superiors), with Maciej Garbowski, Krzysztof Gradziuk, and Dominik Wania
 2017: Unloved (ECM Records), with Dominik Wania, Ole Morten Vågan and Gard Nilssen
 2019: Three Crowns (ECM Records), with Dominik Wania, Ole Morten Vågan and Gard Nilssen

 Obara Internasjonal (Dominik Wania, Gard Nilssen, Ole Morten Vågan, Tom Arthurs)
 2013: Live at Manggha (For Tune)
 2013: Komeda (For Tune), 
 2015: Live in Mińsk Mazowiecki (For Tune),

Collaborations 
 With The Fonda/Stevens Group Trio + 2 (Ireneusz Wojtczak, Michael Jefry Stevens, Joe Fonda, Michael Zerang, Harvey Sorgen)
 2009: Live in Katowice (Not Two)

 With Power Of The Horns
 2011: Alaman (For Tune)

 With Marek Kądziela ADHD
 2015: In Bloom (For Tune)

 With Silberman New Quintet
 2015: Pieśń Gęsi Kanadyjskich (Audio Cave)

References

External links 
 
 
 

Jazz saxophonists
Polish jazz composers
Male jazz composers
ECM Records artists
1981 births
Living people
21st-century saxophonists
21st-century male musicians